`Atud is a village in eastern Yemen. It is located in the Hadhramaut Governorate, Adh Dhlia'ah District. It is near the Al Waḩdah aş Şiḩḩīyah aḑ Ḑulay‘ah clinic.

External links
Towns and villages in the Hadhramaut Governorate

Populated places in Hadhramaut Governorate